The Changan CX30 is a compact sedan and hatchback produced by Chinese car manufacturer Changan Automobile. Originally only available as a sedan called the Changan Z-Shine.

Overview
Originally unveiled the Changan Z-Shine. (codename CV8) It was officially launched at the 2008 Beijing Motor Show.

The model later received a minor facelift and name change to the CX30. Changan unveiled the CX30 compact hatchback at the 2010 Beijing Auto Show.
Engines available for the Changan CX30 are a 1.6L 71kw putting out 140nm of torque and a 2.0L 112kw putting out 192nm of torque. The CX30 sedan, listed in January 2011 was based on the CX30 hatchback and positioned slightly above the CX30 hatchback in the market. Price ranges from 66.800 yuan to 106.800 yuan.

References

External links 

 – Changan Official website
Changan Z-Shine Official site 
2008 Beijing Auto Show Preview: Chang'an Zhixiang at edmunds.com
Chang'an Yuexiang (Alsvin)

Changan CX30 (sedan)
Changan CX30 (hatchback)
2010s cars
Cars of China
Front-wheel-drive vehicles
CX30
Compact cars
Sedans
Hatchbacks